Guayaquil Department was one of the departments of Gran Colombia.

It bordered
 Ecuador Department in the East
 Azuay Department in the South
 Pacific Ocean in the West

Subdivisions 
2 provincias y 9 cantones:

 Guayaquil Province. Capital: Guayaquil. Cantones: Guayaquil, Daule, Babahoyo, Baba, Punta de Santa Elena y Machala.
 Manabí Province. Capital: Portoviejo. Cantones: Portoviejo, Jipijapa, y Montecristi

Departments of Gran Colombia